Zakir Javad oghlu Baghirov (March 16, 1916 — January 8, 1996) was an Azerbaijani composer, professor, and Honored Art Worker of the Azerbaijan SSR.

Biography 
Zakir Baghirov was born on March 16, 1916, in Shusha. After graduating from the Moscow State Conservatory in 1949, he worked as a teacher at the Hajibeyov Azerbaijan State Conservatoire. From 1970 he was the head of the department of music theory. He has been a member of the Composers Union of Azerbaijan since 1950, as well as a member of the Board of this union. In different years he worked as the art director of the Muslim Magomayev Azerbaijan State Philharmonic Hall, the art director of the Committee for Television and Radio Broadcasting of the Republic, the chairman of the Board of the Azerbaijan Music Foundation.

For the first time in 1935, Zakir Bagirov, together with composer Tofig Guliyev, wrote and published mughams "Rast", "Dugah" and "Zabul" performed by tar player Mirza Mansur Mansurov. He is also one of the authors of the collection "Azerbaijani folk dances" (1951).

Z. Baghirov died on January 8, 1996, in Baku.

Awards and honorary titles 
 Honored Art Worker of the Azerbaijan SSR — May 24, 1960
 Order of the Badge of Honour — June 9, 1959
 Medal "For Distinguished Labour" — August 22, 1986

References 

1916 births
1996 deaths

Azerbaijani film score composers

Azerbaijani opera composers
Moscow Conservatory alumni
Soviet composers
Honored Art Workers of the Azerbaijan SSR